Mariyam Azra Ahmed is a Maldivian politician and administrator.

She was President of the Human Rights Commission of the Maldives from 2010 to 2015, and has held the posts of Minister of State for Law and Gender and  Minister of State for Education within the Ministry of Education. She was chairwoman of the state media company Public Service Media. She holds a master's degree from the University of East Anglia.

References

Year of birth missing (living people)
Living people
Alumni of the University of East Anglia
21st-century Maldivian women politicians
21st-century Maldivian politicians